Thrombospondin 1, abbreviated as THBS1, is a protein that in humans is encoded by the THBS1 gene.

Thrombospondin 1 is a subunit of a disulfide-linked homotrimeric protein. This protein is an adhesive glycoprotein that mediates cell-to-cell and cell-to-matrix interactions. This protein can bind to fibrinogen, fibronectin, laminin, collagens types V and VII and integrins alpha-V/beta-1. This protein has been shown to play roles in platelet aggregation, angiogenesis, and tumorigenesis.

Function 

The thrombospondin-1  protein is a member of the thrombospondin family.  It is a multi-domain matrix glycoprotein that has been shown to be a natural inhibitor of neovascularization and tumorigenesis in healthy tissue.  Both positive and negative modulation of endothelial cell adhesion, motility, and growth have been attributed to TSP1.  This should not be surprising considering that TSP1 interacts with at least 12 cell adhesion receptors, including CD36, αv integrins, β1 integrins, syndecan, and integrin-associated protein (IAP or CD47).  It also interacts with numerous proteases involved in angiogenesis, including plasminogen, urokinase, matrix metalloproteinase, thrombin, cathepsin, and elastase.

Thrombospondin-1 binds to the reelin receptors, ApoER2 and VLDLR, thereby affecting neuronal migration in the rostral migratory stream.

The various functions of the TSRs have been attributed to several recognition motifs. Characterization of these motifs has led to the use of recombinant proteins that contain these motifs; these recombinant proteins are deemed useful in cancer therapy. The TSP-1 3TSR (a recombinant version of the THBS1 antiangiogenic domain containing all three thrombosopondin-1 type 1 repeats) can activate transforming growth factor beta 1 (TGFβ1) and inhibit endothelial cell migration, angiogenesis, and tumor growth.

Structure 

Thrombospondin's activity has been mapped to several domains, in particular the amino-terminal heparin-binding domain, the procollagen domain, the properdin-like type I repeats, and the globular carboxy-terminal domain.  The protein also contains type II repeats with epidermal growth factor-like homology and type III repeats that contain an RGD sequence.

N-terminus 

The N-terminal heparin-binding domain of TSP1, when isolated as a 25kDa fragment, has been shown to be a potent inducer of cell migration at high concentrations.  However, when the heparin-binding domain of TSP1 is cleaved, the remaining anti-angiogenic domains have been shown to have decreased anti-angiogenic activity at low concentrations where increased  endothelial cell (EC) migration occurs.  This may be explained in part by the ability of the heparin-binding domain to mediate attachment of TSP1 to cells, allowing the other domains to exert their effects.  The separate roles that the heparin-binding region of TSP1 plays at high versus low concentrations may be in part responsible for regulating the two-faced nature of TSP1 and giving it a reputation of being both a positive and negative regulator of angiogenesis.

Procollagen domain 

Both the procollagen domain and the type I repeats of TSP1 have been shown to inhibit neovascularization and EC migration.  However, it is unlikely that the mechanisms of action of these fragments are the same.  The type I repeats of TSP1 are capable of inhibiting EC migration in a Boyden chamber assay after a 3-4 hour exposure, whereas a 36- to 48-hour exposure period is necessary for inhibition of EC migration with the procollagen domain. Whereas the chorioallantoic membrane (CAM) assay shows the type I repeats of TSP1 to be antiangiogenic, it also shows that the procollagen sequence lacks anti-angiogenic activity.  This may be in part because the animo-terminal end of TSP1 differs more than the carboxy-terminal end across species, but may also suggest different mechanisms of action.

TSP1 contains three type I repeats, only the second two of which have been found to inhibit angiogenesis.  The type I repeat motif is more effective than the entire protein at inhibiting angiogenesis and contains not one but two regions of activity.  The amino-terminal end contains a tryptophan-rich motif that blocks fibroblast growth factor (FGF-2 or bFGF) driven angiogenesis.  This region has also been found to prevent FGF-2 binding ECs, suggesting that its mechanism of action may be to sequester FGF-2.  The second region of activity, the CD36 binding region of TSP1, can be found on the carboxy-terminal half of the type I repeats. It has been suggested that activating the CD36 receptor causes an increase in ECs sensitivity to apoptotic signals. Type I repeats have also been shown to bind to heparin, fibronectin, TGF-β, and others, potentially antagonizing the effects of these molecules on ECs. However, CD36 is generally considered to be the dominant inhibitory signaling receptor for TSP1, and EC expression of CD36 is restricted to microvascular ECs.

Soluble type I repeats have been shown to decrease EC numbers by inhibiting proliferation and promoting apoptosis.  Attachment of endothelial cells to fibronectin partially reverses this phenomenon. However this domain is not without a two-faced nature of its own.  Bound protein fragments of the type I repeats have been shown to serve as attachment factors for both ECs and melanoma cells.

C-terminus 

The carboxy-terminal domain of TSP1 is believed to mediate cellular attachment and has been found to bind to another important receptor for TSP1, IAP (or CD47). This receptor is considered necessary for nitric oxide-stimulated TSP1-mediated vascular cell responses and cGMP signaling. Various domains of and receptors for TSP1 have been shown to have pro-adhesive and chemotactic activities for cancer cells, suggesting that this molecule may have a direct effect on cancer cell biology independent of its anti-angiogenic properties.

Cancer treatment 

One study has suggested that, by blocking TSP1 from binding to its cell surface receptor (CD47) normal tissue confers high resistance to cancer radiation therapy and assists in tumor death.

Interactions 

Thrombospondin 1 has been shown to interact with:
 LRP1, 
 MMP-2, and
 Plasmin.

References

External links 
 

Thrombospondins